Milan Jevtović (born 13 June 1993) is a Serbian footballer who plays as a winger for Odds BK.

Club career

Borac Čačak
Jevtović began his professional career at Borac Čačak, where he and the rest of the team were unpaid for up to six months at a time. Jevtović participated in the players' strike out of protest from unpaid dues in 2015. The strike was interrupted when Nenad Lalatović was hired as the new coach of Borac Čačak, after which a series of positive results followed. In a historic upset on December 2, 2015, Jevtović scored against Red Star Belgrade in a 1–5 away win for Borac.

Antalyaspor
In the summer of 2016, Jevtović joined Turkish side Antalyaspor in a €2.5 million transfer. In his first six months in Antalya, Jevtović saw only 64 minutes of playing time. As a result, he was loaned out to Norwegian club Rosenborg BK, where he saw much more playing time. While Jevtović was on loan, Rosenborg won the 2017 Eliteserien. Jevtović scored the opening goal for Rosenborg in the 2017 Mesterfinalen.

Red Star Belgrade
On 22 June 2018, Jevtović signed with Red Star Belgrade.

AGF Aarhus
On 13 July 2020, he signed a four-year contract with AGF Aarhus, which plays in the Danish Superliga. He made 22 appearances and scored one goal for the club, until he left at the end of August 2021.

Odd
On the last day of the summer transfermarket 2021-22, 31 August 2021, Jevtović moved to Norwegian club Odds BK.

Career statistics

Club

Honours
 Rosenborg
Mesterfinalen: 2017
Eliteserien: 2017

 Red Star 
Serbian SuperLiga: 2018–19

References

External links
 
 Milan Jevtović stats at utakmica.rs 
 

1993 births
Living people
Sportspeople from Čačak
Association football forwards
Serbian footballers
Serbian SuperLiga players
Eliteserien players
Süper Lig players
FK Borac Čačak players
FK Bodø/Glimt players
Antalyaspor footballers
Rosenborg BK players
Aarhus Gymnastikforening players
Odds BK players
Serbian expatriate footballers
Serbian expatriate sportspeople in Norway
Serbian expatriate sportspeople in Turkey
Serbian expatriate sportspeople in Cyprus
Serbian expatriate sportspeople in Denmark
Expatriate footballers in Norway
Expatriate footballers in Turkey
Expatriate footballers in Cyprus
Expatriate men's footballers in Denmark
Red Star Belgrade footballers
Danish Superliga players